Mar Shimun IX Dinkha was the fourth Patriarch of the Chaldean Catholic Church, from 1580 to c.1600.

He moved the seat of the patriarchate of Babylon of the Chaldean Catholic church from Siirt in the Ottoman Empire to Urmia in the Safavid Empire, whereas his successor Shimun X Eliyah moved it to Salmas.

Mar Shimun IX Dinkha was the last Patriarch of the Shemon line to be formally recognized by Rome. He reintroduced the hereditary succession, an unacceptable practice by Roman Catholic Church. His hereditary line of successors Shimun X Eliyah (c. 1600–1638), Shimun XI Eshuyow (1638–1656), Shimun XII Yoalaha (1656–1662) and Shimun XIII Dinkha (1662–1692) resided all in Salmas and were not recognized by Rome.

Shimun XIII Dinkha moved the See to Qochanis in the Ottoman Empire and from 1692 became Patriarch of the Assyrian Church of the East continuing the Shemon line there.

See also
List of Chaldean Catholic Patriarchs of Babylon

Chaldean Catholic Patriarchs of Babylon
1600 deaths
Year of birth unknown
16th-century Eastern Catholic archbishops